Ivar Sahlin (16 December 1895 – 24 November 1980) was a Swedish track and field athlete who competed in the 1920 Summer Olympics and in the 1924 Summer Olympics. He was born in Sundsvall and died in Sigtuna.

In 1920 he finished fourth in the triple jump competition. Four years later he was eliminated in the qualification of the triple jump competition and finished eighth overall. In the high jump event he was also eliminated in the qualification and finished tenth overall.

References

External links
profile
profile 

1895 births
1980 deaths
Swedish male triple jumpers
Swedish male high jumpers
Olympic athletes of Sweden
Athletes (track and field) at the 1920 Summer Olympics
Athletes (track and field) at the 1924 Summer Olympics
People from Sundsvall
Sportspeople from Västernorrland County
20th-century Swedish people